This is a list of electoral results for the electoral district of Glen Iris in Victorian state elections.

Members for Glen Iris

Election results

Elections in the 1970s

Elections in the 1960s

Elections in the 1950s

Elections in the 1940s

References

Victoria (Australia) state electoral results by district